Nationality words link to articles with information on the nation's poetry or literature (for instance, Irish or France).

Events

893:
 Mibu no Tadamine wins the  Koresada no miko no ie no uta'awase (是貞の親王家歌合, "The Poetry Match at Prince Koresada's Residence")

Works published

Births
Death years link to the corresponding "[year] in poetry" article. There are conflicting or unreliable sources for the birth years of many people born in this period; where sources conflict, the poet is listed again and the conflict is noted:

897:
 Abu al-Faraj al-Isfahani (died 967), Iranian scholar of Arab-Quraysh origin who is noted for collecting and preserving ancient Arabic lyrics and poems in his major work, the Kitāb al-Aghānī

898:
 Ōshikōchi Mitsune (died 922), one of the Thirty-six Poetry Immortals of Heian Japan

Deaths
Birth years link to the corresponding "[year] in poetry" article:

890:
 Feb. 12: Henjo (born 816), one of the Six best Waka poets and Thirty-six Poetry Immortals

893:
 Ariwara no Yukihira (born 818), Japanese Heian period courtier, poet and bureaucrat

896:
 Flann mac Lonáin (born unknown), Irish Gaelic poet

897:
 al-Buhturi (born 820), Arabian poet

899:
 Oct. 26: Alfred the Great (born 849), King and poet, wrote Lays of Boethius

See also

 Poetry
 9th century in poetry
 9th century in literature
 List of years in poetry

Other events:
 Other events of the 12th century
 Other events of the 13th century

9th century:
 9th century in poetry
 9th century in literature

Notes

Poetry by year
Poetry